Europe-Jeunesse is a French neo-pagan scouting organization established in 1973 and influenced by Nouvelle Droite values.

History 
After a meeting held in December 1972 between GRECE members Jean Mabire, Maurice Rollet and Jean-Claude Valla to discuss the creation of a pagan scouting organization, Europe-Jeunesse organized its first camp in Bussy-en-Othe in July 1973, under the supervision of Raymond Ferrand, a former member of Europe-Action. The group adopted the symbol of the defunct Europe-Action and the FEN, a hoplite helmet.

Europe-Jeunesse is made up of ten ethno-cultural bans: "Gallia Belgica" for Wallonia, "Liguerie" for the Nice region, "Blood and Gold" around Nîmes, "Armed-Lions" in the Périgord, "Alpine" around Lyon and Grenoble, "An Avel Mor" in Brittany, "Comté Toulousain", "Île-de-France", "Alsace" and "Normandie". Each group is led by around sixty people who are part in maîtrises (supervisory staffs). Activities follow natural pagan rhythms: the equinox, the solstice, the gathering of mistletoe, a camp for the Celtic Festival of Samhain, etc.

Members 
Yvan Benedetti was a member of Europe-Jeunesse in his youth, as were the children of Jean-Yves Le Gallou.

References

Bibliography 

 
 
 

Scouting and Guiding in France
Youth organizations established in 1973
Pan-European nationalism
1973 establishments in France
Modern pagan organizations based in France
New Right (Europe)
Modern pagan organizations established in 1973